The Izh (Oč) is a river in Udmurtia and Tatarstan, Russian Federation, a right-bank tributary of the Kama. It begins near Malye Oshvortsy, Udmurtia and falls to the Nizhnekamsk Reservoir, Kama River, near Golyushurma tract in Agryzsky District, Tatarstan.

The river's major tributaries are the Agryzka, Chazh, Kyrykmas, Varzinka, Varzi and Azevka rivers. The mineralization 300 to 500 mg/L. Its drainage is regulated. The Izhevsk Reservoir was constructed in 1760 to supply Izhevsk industry with water.  Since 1978 it is protected as a natural monument of Tatarstan. There are notable mineral springs in Izh valley. Izhevsk and Agryz are the cities along the river.

References 

Rivers of Tatarstan
Rivers of Udmurtia